The Albanian Basketball Superliga is the men's professional basketball league in Albania. It was founded in 1946 shortly after the formation of the Albanian Basketball Association and it is the highest division in the Albanian Basketball League. The team with the most championships is Partizani who have won 33 championships in total, but none since 1996.

Current teams

Superliga (2022–23)

Winners

Total titles by club

References

See also
 Albanian Basketball League
 Albanian Basketball Cup
 Albanian Basketball Supercup

Superleague
1
1946 establishments in Albania
Sports leagues established in 1946